Klondike Glacier is in Shoshone National Forest, in the U.S. state of Wyoming on the east of the Continental Divide in the Wind River Range. Klondike Glacier is in the Fitzpatrick Wilderness, and descends from the northeastern slopes of Pedestal Peak. The glacier flows east into a proglacial lake and shares a glacial margin with Grasshopper Glacier to the north.

References

See also
 List of glaciers in the United States

Glaciers of Fremont County, Wyoming
Shoshone National Forest
Glaciers of Wyoming